Audubon Township is one of twelve townships in Audubon County, Iowa, United States. As of the 2010 census, its population was 212.

History
Audubon Township was organized in 1873.

Geography
According to the USGS, it contains three cemeteries: Grove, Pleasant Hill and Saint Johns.

References

External links
 US-Counties.com
 City-Data.com

Townships in Audubon County, Iowa
Townships in Iowa
1873 establishments in Iowa
Populated places established in 1873